Claude Saunier (26 February 1943 – 17 October 2022) was a French politician. He served as mayor of Saint-Brieuc and also sat in the French Senate. Saunier died on 17 October 2022, at the age of 79.

References

1943 births
2022 deaths
Socialist Party (France) politicians
People from Saint-Brieuc
Mayors of places in Brittany
French Senators of the Fifth Republic
Senators of Côtes-d'Armor
University of Rennes alumni